Kingston Russell is a settlement and civil parish  west of Dorchester, in the Dorset district, in the county of Dorset, England. In 2001 the parish had a population of 35. The parish touches Compton Valence, Littlebredy, Long Bredy and Winterbourne Abbas. Kingston Russell shares a parish council with Long Bredy.

Features 
There are 4 listed buildings in Kingston Russell.

History 
The name "Kingston" means 'King's stone', it was held by John Russel in 1212.

See also 
 Kingston Russell House
 Kingston Russell Stone Circle

References 

 

Villages in Dorset
Civil parishes in Dorset
West Dorset District